HSJ may refer to:
 Hey! Say! JUMP, a Japanese all-male band
 Health Service Journal, a British news service
 Henry S. Jacobs Camp, the Jewish summer camp in the United States
 Hindu Janajagruti Samiti, an Indian religious organization